Martin Ian Brennan (born 14 September 1982) is an English former professional footballer who played as a goalkeeper and works goalkeeping coach at Boreham Wood.

Career
Brennan was born in Whipps Cross, Greater London. He began as a trainee at Charlton Athletic, before moving to Cambridge United for the 2002–03 season, where he played three times, once in each of the league, FA Cup and Football League Trophy. He then had brief spells with Welling United and Stevenage Borough, before retiring from playing after spending the 2004–05 season with Dagenham & Redbridge.

He then moved into goalkeeper coaching, becoming under-18s coach at Tottenham Hotspur. In 2008 he joined Wycombe Wanderers as first team goalkeeping coach, a position he held until 2012, when he moved on to Fulham. He coached their under-21 goalkeepers for two years, during which time he also appeared on the bench as an over-age player for the under-21s for three games in the 2013–14 season. Brennan was promoted to first team goalkeeping coach in 2014. He left for Leyton Orient in 2016, moving to Hampton & Richmond Borough the following year. He was registered as a player at the Beveree in October 2017, appearing on the bench for three games. In 2019 he joined the backroom staff at Boreham Wood, where he was once again registered as a player in October 2020 and featured on the bench.

References

External links

1982 births
Living people
English footballers
Association football goalkeepers
Charlton Athletic F.C. players
Cambridge United F.C. players
Welling United F.C. players
Dagenham & Redbridge F.C. players
Stevenage F.C. players
National League (English football) players
English Football League players
Tottenham Hotspur F.C. non-playing staff
Wycombe Wanderers F.C. non-playing staff
Fulham F.C. non-playing staff
Leyton Orient F.C. non-playing staff